The Roma people have several distinct populations, the largest being the Roma and the Iberian Calé or Caló, who reached Anatolia and the Balkans in the early 12th century, from a migration out of the Indian subcontinent beginning about 1st century – 2nd century AD. They settled in the areas of present-day Turkey, Greece, Serbia, Romania, Croatia, Moldova, Bulgaria, North Macedonia, Hungary, Albania, Kosovo, Bosnia and Herzegovina, Czech Republic, Slovenia and Slovakia, by order of volume, and Spain. From the Balkans, they migrated throughout Europe and, in the nineteenth and later centuries, to the Americas. The Roma population in the United States is estimated at more than one million.

There is no official or reliable count of the Romani populations worldwide. Many Romani refuse to register their ethnic identity in official censuses for fear of discrimination. Others are descendants of intermarriage with local populations and no longer identify only as Roma, or not at all.

As of the early 2000s, an estimated 4 to 9 million Romani people lived in Europe and Asia Minor, although some Romani organizations estimate numbers as high as 14 million.
Significant Romani populations are found in the Balkan peninsula, in some Central European states, in Spain, France, Russia, and Ukraine. The total number of Romani living outside Europe are primarily in the Middle East and North Africa and in the Americas, and are estimated in total at more than two million. Some countries do not collect data by ethnicity.

The Romani people identify as distinct ethnicities based in part on territorial, religious, cultural and dialectal differences, and self-designation. The main branches are:

 Roma, concentrated in Central and Eastern Europe and Italy, they emigrated (mostly from the 19th century onwards) to the rest of Europe, as well as the Americas;
 Iberian Kale, mostly in Spain (see Romani people in Spain), but also in Portugal (see Romani people in Portugal), Southern France, and Latin America;
 Finnish Kale, in Finland, communities also exist in Sweden;
 Welsh Kale, in Wales, specifically in the Northwestern part of the country in Welsh-speaking areas;
 Romanichal, in England. Communities also exist in the United States, Canada, Australia, New Zealand, South Africa, Northeast Wales, South Wales and in the Scottish Borders
 Sinti, in German-speaking areas of Europe and some neighboring countries;
 Manush, in French-speaking areas of Europe (in French: Manouche); and
 Romanisæl, in Sweden and Norway. The Romani-Swedish population is mostly located in the southern parts of the country.
 Scottish Lowland Gypsies are also considered a Romani group (at least by English Romanichal and Welsh Kale) although they are theorised to be a fusion between Romani and a native Traveller group. Their language is predominantly derived from Romani.
 Muslim Roma, Horahane, Romanlar in Turkey and the Balkans
 Middle East Gypsies

The Romani have additional internal distinctions, with groups identified as Bashaldé; Churari; Lori; Ungaritza; Lovari (Lovara) from Hungary; Machvaya (Machavaya, Machwaya, or Macwaia) from Serbia; Romungro from Hungary and neighbouring Carpathian countries; Erlides (also Yerlii or Arli); Xoraxai (Horahane) from Greece/Turkey; Boyash (Lingurari, Ludar, Ludari, Rudari, or Zlătari) from Romanian/Moldovan miners; Ursari from Romanian/Moldovan bear-trainers; Argintari from silversmiths; Aurari from goldsmiths; Florari from florists; and Lăutari from singers.

Population by country
This is a table of Romani people by country.
The list does include the Dom people, who are often subsumed under "gypsies".

The official number of Romani people is disputed in many countries; some do not collect data by ethnicity; in others, Romani individuals may refuse to register their ethnic identity for fear of discrimination, or have assimilated and do not identify exclusively as Romani. In some cases, governments consult Romani organizations for data.

Central and Eastern Europe

A significant proportion of the world's Romanies live in Central and Eastern Europe. However, in some cases—notably the Kalderash clan in Romania, who work as traditional coppersmiths prospered. Some Romani families choose to immigrate to Western Europe. Many of the former Communist countries like the Czech Republic, Slovakia, Romania, Hungary and Bulgaria have entered the European Union, and free travel is permitted. During the 1970s and 1980s, many Romanies from former Yugoslavia migrated to other European countries, especially Austria, West Germany and Sweden.

Albania

Romani people have been living in Albania for more than 600 years. They arrived from Asia shortly before the Ottoman Turks in the middle of the fifteenth century. They started from India, traveled towards the direction of Persia, Syria, Iraq and through Armenia into the Western Byzantine territories, then through the Balkans into Europe. 1,300-120,000 Roma are estimated to live in Albania.

Bulgaria

Romani people constitute the third largest ethnic group (after Bulgarians and Turks) in Bulgaria, they are referred to as "цигани" (cigani) or "роми" (romi). According to the 2001 census, there were 370,908 Roma in Bulgaria, equivalent to 4.7% of the country's total population.

Greece

The Romani people of Greece is currently estimated to be between 200,000 and 350,000 people.

Crete
Since 1323 the Romani people are mentioned in Crete. Majority settlement are in Nea Alikarnassos,

Hungary

In the 2011 census, 315,583 people called themselves Roma. Various estimations put the number of Roma people to be between 500,000 and 1,000,000 people, or 8–10% of Hungary's population.

Romania

There is a sizable minority of Romani people in Romania, known as Ţigani in Romanian and, recently, as Rromi, of 621,573 people or 3.3% of the total population (2011 census). There exist a variety of governmental and non-governmental programs for integration and social advancement, including the Foundation Policy Center for Roma and Minorities, the National Agency for the Roma and Romania's participation in the Decade of Roma Inclusion. Albania, Bosnia and Herzegovina, Bulgaria, Croatia, Czech Republic, Hungary, Macedonia, Montenegro, Romania, Serbia, Slovakia, and Spain participate in these programs. As an officially recognized ethnic minority, the Romani people also have guaranteed representation in Parliament.

Moldova
A big roma community of east-orthodox christian faith, are the Basketmakers in Glodeni, there ancestors once came from Serbia, settled in Glodeni at the Time of the Teleki-Dynasty.

Russia

In Russian the Romani people are referred to as tzigane. The largest ethnic group of Romani people in Russia are the Ruska Roma. They are also the largest group in Belarus. They are adherents of the Russian Orthodox faith.

They came to Russia in the 18th century from Poland, and their language includes Polish, German, and Russian words.

The Ruska Roma were nomadic horse traders and singers. They traveled during the summer and stayed in cottages of Russian peasants during the winter. They paid for their lodging with money, or with the work of their horses.

In 1812, when Napoleon I invaded Russia, the Romani diasporas of Moscow and Saint Petersburg gave large sums of money and good horses for the Russian army. Many young Romani men took part in the war as uhlans.

At the end of the 19th century, Rusko Rom Nikolai Shishkin created a Romani theatre troupe. One of its plays was in the Romani language.

During World War II some Ruska Roma entered the army, by call-up and as volunteers. They took part in the war as soldiers, officers, infantrymen, tankmen, artillerymen, aviators, drivers, paramedical workers, and doctors. Some teenagers, old men and adult men were also partisans. Romani actors, singers, musicians, dancers (mostly women) performed for soldiers in the front line and in hospitals. A huge number of Roma, including many of the Ruska Roma, died or were murdered in territories occupied by the enemy, in battles, and in the blockade of Leningrad.

After World War II, the music of the Ruska Roma became very popular. Romen Theatre, Romani singers and ensembles prospered. All Romanies living in the USSR began to perceive Ruska Roma culture as the basic Romani culture.

Slovenia
It is estimated that between 10,000 and 12,000 Romani people live in Slovenia.

Kosovo

Kosovan Roma speak either Serbian or Romani as their first language. Most Kosovan Roma are Christian Orthodox, but some practice Islam. 2010 OSCE estimates suggested that there were approximately 34,000 Roma living in Kosovo.

Germany

Roma in Germany are estimated to around 170,000-300,000 individuals, constituting around 0.2-0.4% of the German population.

Czech Republic

Poland

Serbia

Slovakia

Ukraine

Bosnia and Herzegovina

Croatia

North Macedonia

Switzerland
Around 80,000 to 100,000 Roma live in Switzerland.

Western Europe

Belgium
There are about 30,000 Roma in Belgium. Approximately one third of these are described as Travellers, Roms or Manouches/Sinti.

Spain

Romanies in Spain are generally known as Gitanos and tend to speak Caló, a kind of Andalusian Spanish with a large number of Romani loanwords. Estimates of the Spanish Gitano population range between 600,000 and 1,500,000 with the Spanish government estimating between 650,000 and 700,000. Semi-nomadic Quinqui consider themselves apart from the Gitanos.

Portugal

The Romanies in Portugal are known as Ciganos, and their presence goes back to the second half of the 15th century. Early on, due to their socio-cultural difference and nomadic style of live, the Ciganos were the object of fierce discrimination and persecution.

The number of Ciganos in Portugal is difficult to estimate, since there are no official statistics about race or ethnic categories. According to data from Council of Europe's European Commission against Racism and Intolerance there are about 40,000 to 50,000 spread all over the country. According to the Portuguese branch of Amnesty International, there are about 30,000 to 50,000.

France

Romanies are generally known in spoken French as Manouches or Tsiganes. Romanichels or Gitans are considered pejorative and Bohémiens is outdated. Traditionally referred to as gens du voyage ("traveling people"), a term still occasionally used by the media, they are today generally referred to as Roms or Rroms. By law, French municipalities over 5,000 inhabitants have the obligation to allocate a piece of land to Romani travellers when they arrive.

Approximately 500,000 Roma live in France as part of established communities. Additionally, the French Roma rights group FNASAT reports that there are at least 12,000 Roma, primarily from Romania and Bulgaria, living in illegal urban camps throughout the country. French authorities often close down these encampments. In 2009, the government returned more than 10,000 Roma illegal immigrants to Romania and Bulgaria. In the summer of 2012, with mounting criticism of their deportation of Roma migrants, French key ministers met for emergency talks on the handling of an estimated 15,000 Roma living in camps across France. They proposed to lift restrictions on migrants (including Roma) from Bulgaria and Romania who were working in France.

Italy

Romani in Italy are generally known as zingaro (with the plural zingari), a word also used to describe a scruffy or slovenly person or a tinker. The word is likely of Greek origin meaning "untouchables", compare the modern Greek designations Τσιγγάνοι (Tsingánoi), Αθίγγανοι (Athínganoi).  People often use the term "Rom", although the people prefer Romani (in Italian Romanì), which is little used. They are sometimes called "nomads," although many live in settled communities.

Netherlands

Approximately 37,500 Roma people reside in the Netherlands (0.24% of the Dutch population).

Northern Europe
Northern Romani Traveller groups include:
 Romanichal Travellers in England (As well as North East Wales, South Wales and the Scottish Borders), with diaspora communities in the United States, Canada, South Africa, Australia and New Zealand.
 Romanisæl Travellers in Central Norway and Sweden.
 Scottish Lowland Travellers in Lowland Scotland.
 Welsh Kale Travellers in the West-speaking parts of Northwestern Wales.
 Finnish Kale in Finland and parts of Sweden.

Northern Romani generally identify as “Travellers” more than they do as “Gypsies”. These groups have much European heritage due to mixing with Indigenous Traveller groups (British Romani Travellers mix with Irish Travellers, Scottish Highland Travellers and Funfair Traveller and Scandinavian Romani Travellers mix with Indigenous Norwegian Travellers) and even non-Travellers over the centuries. This has led to these Romani groups generally looking White in appearance.

It is also a reason why these groups speak mixed languages rather than more purer forms of Romani:
 Romanichal Travellers speak Angloromani (A mix of English and Romani).
 Romanisæl Travellers speak Scandoromani (A mix of Norwegian, Swedish and Romani).
 Scottish Lowland Travellers speak Scottish Cant (A mix of Scots and Romani).
 Welsh Kale speak Kalá (A mix of Welsh, English and Romani).
 Finnish Kale speak Kalo (A mix of Finnish and Romani).

Northern European Romani groups culturally have more in common with Indigenous Northern European Traveller groups, such as Irish Travellers, Dutch Travellers, Scottish Highland Travellers and Norwegian Travellers then what they do with Romani from the rest of Europe. Northern Romani groups have common ancestry from the wave of Romani who migrated to England and Scotland in the 16th century.

Denmark
The Council of Europe estimates that there are around 5,500 Romanies living in Denmark (0.1% of the population).

Estonia
The Roma population in Estonia is small. The official number of Roma people in Estonia is 584 with the average estimate of 1,250 and the percentage of Estonian Roma in the total population is 0.1% The oldest data on Roma in Estonia date back to the year 1533.

Iceland
Romani families from Romania, Bulgarian and Poland have been living and working in Iceland as part of the East European labour migrant communities.

Finland

The Kale (or Kaale) Romani of Finland are known in Finnish as mustalaiset ('blacks', cf. , 'black') or romanit.  Approximately 10,000 Romani live in Finland, mostly in the Helsinki Metropolitan Area. In Finland, many Romani people wear their traditional dress in daily life. Finnish Kale speak Finnish Kalo.

Norway and Sweden

Romanisæl Travellers in Sweden are the Romani group or Norway and Sweden. They speak Scandoromani.

Recently the term romer has been adopted as a collective designation referring to both Romanisæl Travellers and Eastern European Roma migrant communities, with Resande (Travellers) referring to Romanisæl only.

Approximately 120,000 Romani live in Sweden, including 65,000~ Romanisæl Travellers, the Norwegian and Swedish Romani group, 3,000~ Finnish Kale, the Finnish Romani group who immigrated in the 1960s, and 50,000~ Eastern European Roma, who have only started to immigrate to Sweden (as well as Norway, Finland and Britain) in recent years.

Romanisæl Travellers in Sweden have periodically suffered discrimination at the hands of the state. For example, the state has taken children into foster care, or sterilised Romani women without their consent. Prejudice against Romanies is widespread, with most stereotypes portraying the Romani as welfare cheats, shoplifters, and con artists. For example, in 1992, Bert Karlsson, a leader of Ny Demokrati, said, "Gypsies are responsible for 90% of crime against senior citizens" in Sweden. He had earlier tried to ban Romani from his Skara Sommarland theme park, as he thought they were thieves. Some shopkeepers, employers and landlords continue to discriminate against Romani.

The situation is improving. Several Romani organisations promote education about Romani rights and culture in Sweden. Since 2000, Romani chib is an officially recognised minority language in Sweden. The Swedish government has established a special standing Delegation for Romani Issues. A Romani folk high school has been founded in Gothenburg.

United Kingdom

Romanichal Travellers in England are generally known as Romany Gypsies, English Travellers or English Gypsies. They are found in England (As well as South Wales, Northeast Wales and the Scottish Borders), and they speak Angloromani.

Welsh Kale are Welsh Romani, they are found in the Welsh-speaking parts of Northwestern Wales, and they speak Welsh Kalá.

Scottish Lowland Travellers are Scottish Romani. They are found in Lowland Scotland and they speak Scottish Cant.

Romani have been recorded in the UK since at least the early 16th century. Records of Romani people in Scotland date to the early 16th century.

Many Romanichal emigrated to the British colonies and to the United States during the centuries. Romani number around 300,000 in the UK. This includes the sizable population of Eastern European Roma, who immigrated into the UK in the late 1990s/early 2000s, and also after EU expansion in 2004.

The first recorded reference to "the Egyptians" appeared to be in 1492, during the reign of James IV, when an entry in the Book of the Lord High Treasurer records a payment "to Peter Ker of four shillings, to go to the king at Hunthall, to get letters subscribed to the 'King of Rowmais'". Two days after, a payment of twenty pounds was made at the king's command to the messenger of the 'King of Rowmais'.

According to the Scottish Traveller Education Programme, an estimated 20,000 Scottish Gypsies/Travellers live in Scotland. this includes Scottish Lowland Romani Travellers, Indigenous Scottish Lowland Travellers, Irish Travellers, Funfair Travellers (Showman) as well as Eastern European Roma.

The term "gypsy" in the United Kingdom has come to mean anyone who travels with no fixed abode (regardless of ethnic group). In some parts of the UK, the Romani are commonly called "tinkers" because of their traditional trade as tinsmiths.

Irish Travellers, Scottish Highland Travellers, Funfair Travellers (Showman) are non-Romani Travelling groups found in the United Kingdom.

Ireland

Latvia
The Roma are one of Latvia’s oldest ethnic minorities. According to the Office for Citizenship and Migration Affairs there were 7,456 Roma living in Latvia as of 1 January 2017, comprising 0.3% of the total population.

Lithuania
According to The Department of Statistics under the Government of the Republic of Lithuania, in 2011 general population and housing census data shows that 2,115 Roma lived in Lithuania. The Roma are concentrated in Vilnius, Kaunas, Šiauliai, Panevėžys and Šalčininkai in Lithuania. Kirtimai is the largest Romani settlement in Vilnius.

Central Asia

There is a small Gypsy community in Kazakhstan, Kyrgyzstan, Tajikistan, Uzbekistan and Turkmenistan.

West Asia
One route taken by the medieval proto-Romani cut across Indian Subcontinent to Roman Egypt and Asia Minor to Europe. Numerous Romani continue to live in Asia Minor. Other Romani populations in the Middle East are the result of modern migrations from Europe. Also found in the Middle East are various groups of the Dom people, often identified as "gypsies." They are derived from a migration out of northwestern India beginning about 600 years earlier.

Armenia
There is a Lom community in Armenia. They speak Lomavren.

Azerbaijan

Georgia
Approximately 1,500 Roma are registered in Georgia. They primarily live in Tbilisi and Gachiani.

Cyprus

History
Historians estimate that the first immigrants came between 1322 and 1400, when Cyprus was under the rule of the Lusignan (Crusader) kings. These Roma were part of a general movement from Asia Minor to Europe. Those who landed on Cyprus probably came across from the Crusader colonies on the eastern Mediterranean coast.

There is no evidence suggesting one cause for the Roma to leave mainland Asia, but historical events caused widespread upheaval and may have prompted a move to the island. In 1347 the Black Death had reached Constantinople, the capital of the Byzantine Empire; in 1390 the Turks defeated the Greek kingdom in Asia; and ten years later, the Battle of Aleppo marked the advance of the Mongols under Tamerlane.

The first surviving written record of Roma in Cyprus is from 1468. In the Chronicle of Cyprus compiled by Florio Bustron, the Cingani are said to have paid tax to the royal treasury, at that time under King James II. Later, in 1549, the French traveler Andre Theret found "les Egyptiens ou Bohemiens" in Cyprus and other Mediterranean islands. He noted their simple way of life, supported by the production of nails by the men and belts by the women, which they sold to the local population.

During the Middle Ages, Cyprus was on a regular shipping route from Bari, Italy to the Holy Land. Second immigration likely took place sometime after the Turks dominated the island in 1571. Some Kalderash came in the 19th century.

Currently, Muslim Roma in Cyprus refer to themselves as Gurbeti, and their language as Kurbetcha, although most no longer speak it. Christian or Greek-speaking Roma are known as Mantides.

According to the Council of Europe there are 1000–1500 (0.16%) Romanis living in Cyprus .

Names of Roma in Cyprus
Tsinganos: the official term used in Greek documents and written material. It comes from the term Cingani (used in the 1468 text), which in turn comes from the archaic word Adsincan, used in mediaeval Byzantium.
Yiftos: the Cypriot dialect form of mainland Greek Yiftos. This is common in speech and comes from earlier Aigiptos, a reference to the earlier belief that the Romanies came from Egypt.
Gurbeti: the local term used by Turkish-speaking Cypriots, a Roma group of Doms which is also present in Syria. 
(For additional names of Roma in Greek-speaking Cyprus, see Roma in Greece)

Israel
A community anciently related to the Romani are the Dom people. Some live in Israel, the Palestinian territories and in neighboring countries.

Lebanon
It is estimated that there are 5,000 Romanis or Domaris in Lebanon. The language of Romanis is called Domari in Lebanon and neighboring countries. There is evidence that child labor was prevalent in Romani communities in Lebanon.

Turkey

Romani people in Turkey are generally known as Romanlar, Çingene, Çingen, or Çingan, as well as Çingit (West Black Sea region), Kıptî (meaning Coptic), Şopar (Kırklareli), Romanlar (İzmir) and Gipleri (derived from the term "Egyptian"). Since the late twentieth century, some have started to recognize and cherish their Romani background as well. Music, blacksmithing and other handicrafts are their main occupations.

Overseas
Most Romani populations overseas were founded in the 19th century by emigration from Europe. There were Roma with Christopher Columbus on his third voyage to Hispaniola in 1498.

North America

United States

At the beginning of the 19th century, the first major Romani group, the Romanichal from Great Britain, arrived in North America, although some had also immigrated during the colonial era. They settled primarily in the United States, which was then more established than most English-speaking communities in Upper Canada. Later immigrants also settled in Canada.

The ancestors of the majority of the contemporary local Romani population in the United States, who are Eastern European Roma, started to immigrate during the second half of the century, drawn by opportunities for industrial jobs. Among these groups were the Romani-speaking peoples such as the Kalderash, Machvaya, Lovari and Churari, as well as groups who had adopted the Romanian language, such as the Boyash (Ludari). Most arrived either directly from Romania after their liberation from slavery between 1840 and 1850, or after a short-period in neighboring states, such as Russia, Austria-Hungary, or Serbia. The Bashalde arrived from what is now Slovakia (then Austria-Hungary) about the same time. Many settled in the major industrial cities of the era.

Immigration from Eastern Europe decreased drastically in the post-World War II era, during the years of Communist rule. It resumed in the 1990s after the fall of Communism. Romani organizations estimate that there are about one million Romani in the United States.

Cuba
An Afro-Romani population exists in central Cuba.

Barbados
England banished the Roma to Barbados during the colonial era. According to folklore, the Romani population intermarried with the local indigenous people.

Canada
According to the 2006 Canadian census, there were 2,590 Canadians of full or partial Romani descent.

Mexico

According to data collected by the Instituto Nacional de Estadística y Geografía, the Romani in Mexico numbered 15,850, however, the total number is likely larger.

Caribbean
During the early modern era, Romani slaves were transported to European colonies in the Caribbean from the 15th to 18th centuries. The first Romani slaves to arrive in the Caribbean came as part of the third voyage of Christopher Columbus in 1498. In 1793, writer John Moreton noted in his work West India Customs and Manners that many Romani in Jamaica worked as prostitutes.

South America

Argentina
The Romani people in Argentina number more than 300,000. They traditionally support themselves by trading used cars and selling their jewelry, while travelling all over the country.

Brazil

Romani groups settled the Brazilian states of Espirito Santo, Rio de Janeiro and Minas Gerais primarily in the late 19th century. The Machvaya came from present-day Serbia (then Austria-Hungary), the Kalderash from Romania, the Lovari from Italy, and the Horahane from Greece and Turkey. Initially, the Romani in Brazil were believed to be descended from ancestors who were exiled in the colony by the Portuguese Inquisition but more has been learned about the peoples. The current population of ethnic Romani is estimated at 600,000. Most are descended from ethnic Kalderash, Macwaia, Rudari, Horahane, and Lovara.

Chile
A sizeable population of Romani people live in Chile. As they continue their traditions and language, they are a distinct minority who are widely recognized. Many continue semi-nomadic lifestyles, travelling from city to city and living in small tented communities. A Chilean telenovela called Romane was based on the Romani. It portrayed their lifestyles, ideas and occasionally featured the Chilean-born actors speaking in the Romani language, with subtitles in Spanish.

Colombia

The first Romani in Colombia are thought to have come from Spain and were formerly known as Egipcios settling primarily in the Departments of Santander, Norte de Santander, Atlántico, Tolima, Antioquia, Sucre, Bogotá D.C. and in smaller numbers in the Departments of Bolívar, Nariño and Valle del Cauca.

In 1999, the Colombian Government recognized the Romani people as a national ethnic minority, and today, around 8,000 Roma are present in Colombia. Their language has been officially recognized as a minority language.

Venezuela
There is a significant Romani population in Venezuela.

Uruguay

Africa

Angola
In spite of a ban introduced in 1720, a number of Romani families arrived in the country during the time when Angola was a Portuguese colony. It is unlikely the community survived to the present day.

South Africa
A small number of Kalderash live in South Africa.

Egypt

Morocco

Algeria

Oceania

Australia

There is a small Romani population in Australia.

New Zealand
A small Romani community exists in New Zealand. There are an estimated 1,500–3,000 Roma individuals in New Zealand.

See also
 Roma Route
 List of Romani people
 List of Romani settlements
 History of the Romani people
 Indian diaspora

References

External links

Names of the Romani People
Opre Roma: Gypsies in Canada
president Nicolas Ramanush / Brazil.
Roma Rights Network – Roma Rights Map
Are the Roma Primitive, or Just Poor? {Plus its 10/24 NYTimes Letters to the Editor: The Rancor Against Roma in Europe]

 

European diasporas
Diaspora by ethnic group
Indian diaspora